Play with Bootsy is an album by Parliament-Funkadelic bassist Bootsy Collins. The album was originally released in 2002 by East-West Records, which is distributed by the Warner Music Group in Germany and by Warner Music-Japan. It was later released in the U.S. by Thump Records. The album represents Bootsy's 12th studio album. The album features a number of prominent rappers/musicians including Snoop Dogg, Fat Joe, Daz, Bobby Womack, Chuck D, Kelli Ali and Lady Miss Kier from Deee Lite.

Track listing

"Inner-Planetary-Funksmanship"  
"Play with Bootsy"  
"Love Gangsta"  
"Soul Sista"  
"Don't Let 'Em"  
"A Life for da Sweet Ting" 
"Groove Eternal"  
"Dance to the Music"  
"Funky and You Know It"
"I'm Tired of Good, I'm Trying Bad" featuring Lady Miss Kier
"All Star Funk"  featuring Lady Miss Kier and Can 7
"The Bomb" featuring Fatboy Slim 
"Funk Ship"  
"Play With Bootsy" - Alex Gopher Remix (featured on the Japanese pressing - AMCE 10007)
"Pressin' On" (featured on the Japanese pressing - AMCE 10007)

Musical guests/personnel

Chuck D
Professor Griff
Fat Joe
Bobby Womack
Garry Shider
George Clinton
Kelli Ali
Snoop Dogg
Daz Dillinger
Rosie Gaines
Bernie Worrell
Lady Miss Kier
Fat Boy Slim
Kristen Grey
Fred Wesley
Belita Woods
Kendra Foster
Ray Davis
Sly Dunbar
Robbie Shakespeare
Michael Hampton
Ron Jennings
Macy Gray
Ailsa Achat

2002 albums
Bootsy Collins albums